Bayantooroi  is a settlement in the Tsogt sum (district) of Govi-Altai Province in western Mongolia.

Bayantooroi is an irrigated cropping settlement in a Gobi desert oasis, 62 km south of Tsogt sum center. The headquarters for the Great Gobi A and the Great Gobi B Strictly Protected Areas are in Bayantooroi. Eej Khairkhan Uul natural monument is 50 km west of Bayantooroi.

Populated places in Mongolia
Gobi Desert